Women's Combined World Cup 1980/1981

Final point standings

In Women's Combined World Cup 1980/81 all 5 results count.

Women's Combined Team Results

All points were shown. bold indicate highest score - italics indicate race wins

References
 fis-ski.com

World Cup
FIS Alpine Ski World Cup women's combined discipline titles